The 2012–13 Arkansas State Red Wolves men's basketball team represented Arkansas State University during the 2012–13 NCAA Division I men's basketball season. The Red Wolves, led by fifth year head coach John Brady, played their home games at the Convocation Center, and were members of the West Division of the Sun Belt Conference. They finished the season 19–12, 12–8 in Sun Belt play to be West Division champions. They advanced to the semifinals of the Sun Belt tournament where they lost to WKU. Despite the 19 wins, they did not participate in a postseason tournament.

Roster

Schedule

|-
!colspan=9| Exhibition
 

|-
!colspan=9| Regular season

|-
!colspan=9| 2013 Sun Belt tournament

References

Arkansas State Red Wolves men's basketball seasons
Arkansas State